Venta del Moro is a municipality in the comarca of Requena-Utiel in the Valencian Community, Spain.

List of villages in the municipality
 Casas de Moya
 Casas de Pradas
 Casas del Rey
 Jaraguas
 Las Monjas
 Los Marcos

References

Municipalities in the Province of Valencia
Requena-Utiel